The Mangarevan expedition of 1934 was a scientific expedition to investigate the natural history of the farthest southeastern islands of Polynesia, including Mangareva. It was a comprehensive natural history expedition of a kind more common during the previous century. Sponsored by the Bernice P. Bishop Museum of Honolulu, Hawaii and led by the malacologist Charles Montague Cooke Jr., its research team included the ethnologists Kenneth P. Emory and Peter H. Buck, the botanists Harold St. John and F. Raymond Fosberg, the malacologists Donald Anderson and Yoshio Kondo, and the undergraduate entomologist E. C. Zimmerman. After visiting 56 islands on a voyage of over 14,000 kilometers over a period of six months, they returned with an enormous quantity of data, including perhaps the richest collection ever made of plants in Polynesia.

The main party sailed aboard a converted Japanese fishing vessel, the Myojin Maru renamed the Islander, while Emory led another team aboard the Tiare Tahiti to survey Mangareva and the Tuamotu Islands. During 14 weeks on relatively isolated Napuka Atoll in the Tuamotus, Emory's team collected 200 ethnographic artifacts and recorded 90 songs and chants, along with genealogies and oral histories that remain among of "the most important sources of traditional eastern Polynesian temple ritual." Some of their more colorful adventures and hardships on the atoll are described in the book Road My Body Goes (1937) by the journalist Clifford Gessler, who almost died there from a poisonous coral cut.

Notes

References
 Cooke, C. M. Jr. (1935). Mangarevan Expedition: Report of C. Montague Cooke Jr., Malacologist and Leader. Honolulu: Bernice P. Bishop Museum Bulletin 133.
 Gessler, Clifford. (1937). Road My Body Goes. New York: Reynal and Hitchcock.
 Kamins, Robert M., and Robert E. Potter (1998). Malamalama: A History of the University of Hawaii (University of Hawaii Press), .
 Kirch, Patrick V. (1992). "In Memoriam: Kenneth Pike Emory (1897–1992)." Asian Perspectives 31:1–8.
 Krauss, Bob. (1988) Keneti: The South Seas Adventures of Kenneth Emory. Honolulu: University of Hawaii Press. 
 News (1934). Mangarevan Expedition of the Bernice P. Bishop Museum. Nature 134:876.
 Ziegler, Alan C. (2002) Hawaiian Natural History, Ecology, and Evolution (University of Hawaii Press), .
 Zimmerman, Elwood C. (2001). Insects of Hawaii, vol. 1: Introduction, with a New Preface and Dedication (University of Hawaii Press), .

Mangareva
Pacific expeditions
History of French Polynesia
Expeditions from the United States
1934 in French Polynesia